The Crimson Field is a British period drama television series that was broadcast beginning on BBC One on 6 April 2014. The series shows the lives of medics and the patients at a fictional field hospital in France during the First World War.

Cast

Rupert Graves as Major Edward Crecy
Oona Chaplin as Kitty Trevelyan
Hermione Norris as Grace Carter
Suranne Jones as Sister Joan Livesey
Kevin Doyle as Lt Col Roland Brett
Kerry Fox as Sister Margaret Quayle
Alex Wyndham as Captain Miles Hesketh-Thorne
Jeremy Swift as Quartermaster Sergeant Reggie Soper
Richard Rankin as Captain Thomas Gillan
Marianne Oldham as Rosalie Berwick
Alice St. Clair as Flora Marshall
Jack Gordon as Orderly Corporal Peter Foley
Liam James Collins as Tommy
Lewis C. Elson as Injured Soldier

Production
Originally called The Ark, the series was commissioned by Ben Stephenson and Danny Cohen as part of the BBC World War I centenary season. Sarah Phelps, the creator of The Crimson Field said: "I am bouncing off the walls with excitement at having such an extraordinary talented cast, bouncing off the walls."

Filming began in August 2013. The Historic Dockyard Chatham and HMS Gannet featured in the first episode of the series doubling as the Port of Boulogne, France. Dyrham Park appeared in scenes as a French hotel.

Episodes

Cancellation
The show was cancelled after one series, due to a lacklustre critical and audience response, as well as budgetary considerations towards other BBC series. Phelps revealed she had planned four more series.

See also
 Alexis Carrel and Henry Drysdale Dakin, developers of the pre-antibiotic antiseptic Carrel-Dakin method depicted in the series.
 Edith Cavell, the British Red Cross nurse whose execution by German firing squad is mentioned in Episode 6.

References

External links
 
 
 

BBC television dramas
2014 British television series debuts
2014 British television series endings
2010s British drama television series
Television shows set in France
BBC high definition shows
English-language television shows
World War I television drama series
2010s British television miniseries